Cape Terawhiti is the southwesternmost point of the North Island of New Zealand.

The cape is located 16 kilometres to the west of Wellington, the capital city of New Zealand. Ohau Point, located on the northern tip of Cape Terawhiti and, along with Perano Head on Arapaoa Island in the Marlborough Sounds, marks the narrowest part of Cook Strait.

It is also the closest point in the North Island to the South Island, with West Head, at the mouth of the Tory Channel being only 28 kilometres away (this point in the South Island lies to the northwest of Cape Terawhiti).

Cape Terawhiti, from which historic Terawhiti Station gets its name, came into being through a misconception of Captain Cook’s Tahitian interpreter, Tupaea. When, in 1769, Cook asked what the land in the east was, the local Maori replied simply, 'the east'. In fact Te Ra-whiti (The Rising Sun) is the general Maori term for the East Coast of the North Island. Omere is said to be the original name of Cape Terawhiti.

At the southern end of Cape Terawhiti is Oteranga Bay, the termination point for the inter-island Cook Strait power cable. The proper name for the bay is Oterongo.

The Maria, on its way from Lyttelton Harbour to Wellington, foundered at Cape Terawhiti on 23 July 1851, with the loss of 26 lives and 2 survivors. One of those drowned was the early Canterbury settler William Deans. Gold was found near Cape Terawhiti in 1862 and was mined for several years.

References

Terawhiti
Cook Strait